Karl Schlögel (born 7 March 1948 in Hawangen, Bavaria, Germany) is a noted German historian of Eastern Europe who specialises in modern Russia, the history of Stalinism, the Russian diaspora and dissident movements, Eastern European cultural history and theoretical problems of historical narration.

Work 
He is the author of numerous highly acclaimed monographs and the winner of the Leipzig Book Fair Prize for non-fiction in 2018 for his most recent work. His earlier work appeared in English in 2012 as Moscow 1937. For this work he received the Preis des Historischen Kollegs in 2016.

Bibliography 
In English
 Ukraine: A Nation on the Borderland. Reaktion Books, 2018.
 The Soviet Century: Archaeology of a Lost World. Princeton University Press, 2023.

References 

Writers from Unterallgäu
1948 births
Knights Commander of the Order of Merit of the Federal Republic of Germany
Recipients of the Pour le Mérite (civil class)
Living people
Recipients of the Medal of Pushkin